David Logan (born 5 December 1963) is an English former professional footballer who played in the Football League for Halifax Town, Mansfield Town, Northampton Town, Scarborough and Stockport County.

References

1963 births
Living people
English footballers
Association football defenders
English Football League players
Whitby Town F.C. players
Mansfield Town F.C. players
Northampton Town F.C. players
Halifax Town A.F.C. players
Stockport County F.C. players
Scarborough F.C. players
Bishop Auckland F.C. players
Billingham Synthonia F.C. players
Northallerton Town F.C. players